Ano Pogoni is a former municipality in the Ioannina regional unit, Epirus, Greece. Since the 2011 local government reform it is part of the municipality Pogoni, of which it is a municipal unit. The municipal unit has an area of 137.084 km2. Population 1,490 (2011). The seat of the municipality was in Kefalovryso.

Subdivisions
The municipal unit Ano Pogoni is subdivided into the following communities (constituent villages in brackets):
Agios Kosmas
Kakolakkos
Kato Meropi
Kefalovryso
Meropi  (formerly Roumpates) 
Oraiokastro
Palaiopyrgos
Roupsia
Vasiliko

Population

Names
The name Ano Pogoni means "Upper Pogoni". Some Albanian toponyms exist for names of villages in the Pogoni area such as Roumpates meaning robe or garment.

History
During the Balkan Wars (autumn 1912) a number of villages in the area were affected by raids of Muslim bands. At the end of the Balkan Wars most of the Pogoni area became part Greece, while six villages (Lower Pogoni) were ceded to the newly established Principality of Albania.

References

Populated places in Ioannina (regional unit)